Garden Town (Punjabi, Shahrak-e-Bagh) is a residential neighborhood and union council located in Gulberg Tehsil of Lahore, Punjab, Pakistan.

History
Garden Town was acquired in 1958 by the Lahore Development Authority, which at that time was called the Lahore Improvement Trust. Prior to that the majority of the land was being used for agriculture. Due to its close proximity to Canal Road, it was a popular place to settle among businessmen. During the 1970s urban development increased significantly, when Punjab University opened its new campus along Garden Town's northern boundary. Development continued up until the 1980s and by the 1990s, most of the plots had been developed.

Location
Garden Town is located within the administrative town of Gulberg Tehsil.

The borders surrounding Garden Town are:
 North – Canal Bank Road, Punjab University, New Campus
 South – Model Town
 East – Gulberg
 West – Faisal Town

Blocks
Garden Town is divided into 12 blocks:

 Garden Block – plot measuring 1000, 2000 and 4000 square yards (2,4 and 8 kanal)
 Ahmed Block – plots measuring 5000 square yards facing the canal (10 kanal)
 Abu Bakr Block – plots measuring 5000 square yards (10 kanal)
 Ali Block – plot measuring 175 and 250 square yards (7 and 10 marla) as well as 4000 square yard (8 kanal) plots located on Abul Hassan Isfahani Road.
 Usman Block – plots measuring 500, 1000 and 2000 square yards (1, 2 and 4 kanal)
 Jevan Hana/Abadi Devasabad – located between Usman, Ali, Garden and Ahmed Blocks is an area called Abadi Devasabad and plots neighboring this abadi have lower value
 Tipu Block – originally had plot sizes measuring 1000, 2000 and 4000 square yards (2, 4 and 8 kanal), but after subdivisions, 500 square yard (1 kanal) plots were only available
 Babar Block – originally had plot sizes measuring 1000, 2000 and 4000 square yards (2, 4 and 8 kanal), but after subdivisions, 500 square yard (1 kanal) plots were only available
 Aibak Block – plots measuring 500 to 2000 square yards (1 and 4 kanal)
 Aurangzeb Block – plots measuring 500 and 1000 square yards (1 and 2 kanal)
 Tariq Block – plots measuring 500 and 1000 square yards (1 and 2 kanal)
 Ata Turk Block –  plots measuring 125 square yards (5 marla) to 1000 square yards (2 kanal)
 Sher Shah Block – plots measuring 125 square yards (5 marla) to 1000 square yards (2 kanal)

Residents
Garden Town has a population of 250,000 people, and is among the most popular neighbourhoods in Lahore due to its prime location. The majority of its residents belong to the upper middle class and consist of businessmen as well as students who attend the various colleges and universities in the area, namely Punjab University. It is also home to some celebrities, politicians and overseas Pakistanis. The community in recent years has developed a vibrant social life and a literate elite. Property value has increased significantly in the past five years due to location of Garden Town and the development of Barkat Market. A typical residential home in the area can cost anywhere from U.S. $100,000 to $450,000.

Education
Primary
 Al Marooj Comprehensive Boys School
 Beaconhouse Boys Public School
 Bridges Preschool
 Cadet College Lahore
 Scholar Inn Cadet School
 Silk The Laureate School
Secondary
 Allied Boys High School
 Dar-e-Arqam Girls High School
 Gosha-e-Atfal Girls High School
 Government F.D Model High School (Garden Town)
 Government Girls High School (Barkat Market)
 Himayat-e-Islam Girls College
 Unique High School
Post-Secondary
 Grace College of Business Studies 
 SKANS School of Accountancy

Banks
JS Bank
MCB Bank
Faysal Bank
UBL
Meezan Bank
HBL

Hospitals
 Hameed Latif Hospital
 Rasheed Hospital
 Zainab Memorial
 Masood Hospital
Lahore Medical City hospital

Barkat Market
In 2005, Barkat Market underwent massive redevelopment. Changes included increased parking space, widening of the footpath as well as reconstruction of all the roads in the market area. There are many shopping malls, restaurants and cafes in the area as well the famous Mughal-e-Azam wedding hall.

Transportation
Commercialization in this area has immensely increased the traffic flow, not only on the main roads but also on the small lanes and access roads which are unable to cope with the large volume. This has been primarily due to the mushroom growth of small institutes, ranging from tuition academies to schools, offices and colleges operating here. Commuting to different parts of the city is easy due to adequate public transport. Garden Town is among the regions to be served by the future Lahore Metro.

Politics
 Union Council 126, represented by Senator Shafqat Mehmood.

See also
 Model Town, Lahore
 Gulberg, Lahore
 Lahore

References

External links
 https://web.archive.org/web/20081219165519/http://www.lahore.gov.pk/

Gulberg, Lahore